Hale is a unisex given name. Notable people with the name include:

Male
Hale Appleman (born 1986), American actor
Hale Ascher VanderCook (1864–1949), American composer and musician
Hale Boggs (1914–1972), American politician
Hale Hentges (born 1996), American football player
Hale Irwin (born 1945), American golfer
Hale Johnson (1847–1902), American politician
Hale Tharp (1828–?), American gold prospector
Hale T-Pole (Tevita Hale Nai Tu'uhoko) (born 1979), Tongan rugby union footballer
Hale Woodruff (1900–1980), American artist
Hale Zukas (1943–2022), American disability rights activist

Female
Hale Soygazi (born 1950), Turkish actress

Fictional characters
Hale Santiago, in the Canadian television series Lost Girl

See also
Haleh, feminine given name of which Hale is an alternate spelling
Hale (surname)
Hale (disambiguation)

Turkish feminine given names
English masculine given names
Unisex given names